Lalit Mohan Jain ललित मोहन जैन, of the Indian Administrative Service, served as the National Commissioner of the Bharat Scouts and Guides from November 1995.

Jain served as the first Director of the National Informatics Centre from 1983 to 1984.

Jain (then International Scout Commissioner) took initiative to create the National Youth Complex at Gadpuri, which met with success on February 23, 1989 when a plot of 8.70 sq. acres was procured. The Lalit Mohan Jain Cub and Bulbul Park at the National Training Centre at Pachmarhi is named after him.

In 2008, he was awarded the 317th Bronze Wolf, an award of the World Organization of the Scout Movement, for exceptional services to world Scouting.

References

External links
 http://www.bsgindia.org/
 https://web.archive.org/web/20070701101500/http://hipa.nic.in/P19.pdf
 http://www.bsgindia.org/Programmes.htm

Year of birth missing (living people)
Scouting and Guiding in India
Living people
Indian Administrative Service officers
Recipients of the Bronze Wolf Award